Gobekko is an extinct genus of gecko or gecko-like lizard from the Late Cretaceous Djadokhta Formation of the Gobi Desert in Mongolia. Gobekko is either a basal member of Gekkota, the group that includes geckos and the legless pygopodid lizards, or a stem-gekkotan outside Gekkota but within the larger group Gekkonomorpha. It is the fourth oldest known member of Gekkonomorpha after Hoburogekko, a gecko from the Early Cretaceous of Mongolia, AMNH FR21444, an unnamed specimen also from the Early Cretaceous of Mongolia, and Cretaceogekko, a gecko preserved in amber from the Early Cretaceous of Burma.

References

Cretaceous lizards
Late Cretaceous lepidosaurs of Asia
Geckos
Djadochta fauna
Gobi Desert
Fossil taxa described in 1990